was a samurai and court official of Japan's Nara period. A child of Ōno no Hatayasu (大野 果安).

In 724, he fought alongside Fujiwara no Umakai against the Emishi people of Mutsu Province.  Azumabito was later appointed to the Imperial positions of chinjufu-shōgun (Commander-in-chief of the Defense of the North) and Azechi (Inspector).  He also aided in the suppression of the 740 revolt of Fujiwara no Hirotsugu (the Dazai shoni of the Dazaifu on Kyushu).  The rebellion ended with Fujiwara's defeat and death.

Notes

References
 Papinot, Edmund. (1906) Dictionnaire d'histoire et de géographie du japon. Tokyo: Librarie Sansaisha   OCLC 68590081; translated into English in 1909 as Historical and Geographical Dictionary of Japan"  OCLC 672613069 
 Titsingh, Isaac. (1834). Nihon Ōdai Ichiran''; ou,  Annales des empereurs du Japon.  Paris: Royal Asiatic Society, Oriental Translation Fund of Great Britain and Ireland.  OCLC 5850691

Ono no Azumabito
Ono no Azumabito
742 deaths
Year of birth unknown
Place of birth unknown
Date of death unknown
Place of death unknown
People of Nara-period Japan